Said Ramadan (April 12, 1926 in Shibin Al Kawm, Al Minufiyah – August 4, 1995 in Geneva) was an Egyptian political activist and humanitarian, and one of the preeminent leaders of the Muslim Brotherhood.

He was the son-in-law of Hassan al-Banna, the Muslim Brotherhood's founder, and emerged as one of the brotherhood's main leaders in the 1950s. Ramadan was often accused by the Egyptian government of Gamal Abdul Nasser of being in the CIA's pay.  After being expelled from Egypt for his activities, Ramadan moved to Saudi Arabia where he was one of the original members of the constituent council of the Muslim World League, a charity and missionary group funded by the Saudi government. From the 1950s, he was considered the Muslim Brotherhood's unofficial "foreign minister."

He also had a pivotal role in Pakistan-- where he met Mawdudi, was endorsed by Prime Minister Liaquat Ali Khan, who prefaced one of his books--and wore a Jinnah cap to better integrate, that "made people forget he was Egyptian" : moving there in 1948, after the creation of Israel, in order to attend the World Muslim Congress held in Karachi as the representative of the Muslim Brotherhood, he wasn't chosen as the WIC's secretary-general because of his extremism.  He still would have an influence on by hosting weekly radio programs and publishing booklets discussing Islamic affairs, influencing young Pakistani intellectuals.  His work as an ideologue is said to have contributed in making Pakistan an Islamic Republic in 1956, as "he was omnipresent in the media - arguing, on every occasion, for legislation based on the sharia."

From the 1950s, Ramadan enjoyed extensive support from the CIA, which saw him as an ally in the battle against communism; by the end of the 1950s, "the CIA was overtly backing Ramadan. While it's too simple to call him a US agent, in the 1950s and 1960s the United States supported him as he took over a mosque in Munich, kicking out local Muslims to build what would become one of the Brotherhood's most important centers – a refuge for the beleaguered group during its decades in the wilderness. In the end, the US didn't reap much for its efforts, as Ramadan was more interested in spreading his Islamist agenda than fighting communism."

Said Ramadan was the father of Hani Ramadan and Tariq Ramadan. On 9 August 1995 Ramadan was interred next to his father-in-law Hassan al-Banna. The Said Ramadan Peace Prize is named in his honour.

Books and booklets
Islamic law; its scope and equity
Islam and nationalism
Three major problems confronting the world of Islam
Islam, doctrine and way of life
What we stand for
What is an Islamic state?

References

1995 deaths
Muslim Brotherhood founders
Egyptian Muslim Brotherhood members
1926 births
People of the Central Intelligence Agency
CIA and Islamism